Uglovsky District is an administrative and municipal district (raion), one of the fifty-nine in Altai Krai, Russia. It is located in the southwest of the krai. Its administrative center is the rural locality (a selo) of Uglovskoye. As of the 2010 Census, the total population of the district was 13,888, with the population of Uglovskoye accounting for 31.5% of that number.

References

Notes

Sources

Districts of Altai Krai
1924 establishments in Russia